Elk River may refer to:

Municipalities
Elk River, California - a small community located at the edge of Eureka, California
Elk River, California, former name of Elk, Mendocino County, California
Elk River, Idaho
Elk River, Minnesota

Rivers and related topography

Canada
Elk River (Alberta)
Elk River (British Columbia)
Elk River (Northwest Territories), see List of rivers of the Northwest Territories
Elk River (Vancouver Island), on Vancouver Island, British Columbia
Elk River Mountains, on Vancouver Island, British Columbia, Canada

Poland
Ełk River

United States
Elk River (California)
Elk River (Colorado)
Elk River (Iowa)
Elk River (Kansas)
Elk River (Maryland)
Elk River (Michigan)
Elk River (Minnesota)
Elk River (North Carolina)
Elk River (Oklahoma), a stream in Oklahoma and Missouri
Elk River (Oregon)
Elk River (Tennessee)
Elk River (Washington)
Elk River (Wisconsin)
Elk River (West Virginia)